Nathaniel Willis Washington (May 2, 1914 – August 18, 2007) was an American politician in the state of Washington. He served in the Washington House of Representatives from 1973 to 1979 for district 13, and in the Senate from 1979 to his death in 2007.

References

1914 births
2007 deaths
Democratic Party members of the Washington House of Representatives
20th-century American politicians
People from Grant County, Washington
Democratic Party Washington (state) state senators